The Group on International Perspectives on Governmental Aggression and Peace (GIPGAP) is an international multi-disciplinary team of academics and researchers. The group has been undertaking extensive research into social attitudes to peace and war, using the Personal and Institutional Rights to Aggression and Peace Scale, or PAIRTAPS. There is no shortage of critical literature on peace and war. However this is the first-ever global study of the attitudes of ordinary citizens to peace and war. GIPGAP is co-ordinated by Kathleen Malley-Morrison of Boston University, and has its origins in an earlier group that investigated domestic violence within a project entitled International Perspectives on Family Violence and Abuse. The GIPGAP project involves surveying and analysis of the views of citizens from more than 30 countries —covering North America, South America, Central America, Western Europe, Eastern Europe, the Middle East, Africa, the Asia Pacific, South Asia, Australia, and the Pacific Islands.

GIGAP membership
The GIPGAP website indicates the membership as follows:

Research instrument
The basic research instrument, the Personal and Institutional Rights to Aggression and Peace Scale, is an online survey, utilizing aspects of both qualitative research and quantitative research. Respondents are encouraged to indicate the degree to which they agree or disagree with certain propositions and the instrument also encourages respondents to make specific comment upon issues. The survey is available to respondents in a range of language versions, including English, French, German, Greek, Icelandic, Italian, Japanese, and Portuguese.

Research findings
Preliminary findings for individual countries can be found in the publications list and especially the 4-volume publication in 2009 by Praeger International. In general, there was disapproval for the notion that nations should have a right to invade other nations, disapproval for the use of torture, disapproval for the killing of civilians, approval for the right to protest war, and tentative approval for the notion of a right to peace.  Women were very much in support of the notion of the right of children to grow up in a world of peace. Further research, analysis and scholarly publication is planned for the future.

GIPGAP research publications

Books
 GIPGAP (2009) State Violence and the Right to Peace. Ed. K. Malley-Morrison. 4 Volumes. Westport: Praeger Security International.
 GIPGAP (2013) International Handbook on War, Torture and Terrorism. Ed. K. Malley-Morrison. New York: Springer.
 GIPGAP (2013) International Handbook on Peace and Reconciliation. Ed. K. Malley-Morrison. New York: Springer.

Journal articles
Ashy, M.A. & Malley-Morrison, K. (2007). Attitudes towards war in the Middle East from an extremism model perspective. International Psychology Bulletin,11, 8–11.
Castanheira, H., Corgan, M. & Malley-Morrison, K. (2007). Is peace possible? Citizens´ views. Peace Psychology
Corgan, M., & Malley-Morrison, K. (2008, Spring). Operation Urgent Folly. International Psychology Bulletin, 28–30.
Corgan, M., Malley-Morrison, K., & Castanheira, H. (2008). Peace restoration: An ecological formulation. Peace Psychology. 16(2): 8–9.
Daskalopoulos, M., Zaveri, T., & Malley-Morrison, K. (2006). Greek, Spanish and American perspectives on the right of a country to invade. Peace Psychology, 15(2), 12–14.
Hashim, K. & Malley-Morrison, K. (2007. Summer). Attitudes toward international treaties and human rights agreements, Peace Psychology, 16, 1
Lee, Y., Jang, M., Malley-Morrison, K. (2008, Summer). Perceptions of Child Maltreatment in European Americans, Korean Americans, and Koreans. International Psychology Bulletin, 12, 13–16.
Malley-Morrison, K., & Castanheira, H. (2008). Can governmental aggression be acceptable? Views from the United States and Spain. International Psychology Bulletin, 12(1), 16–21.
Malley-Morrison, K., Corgan,M., & Castanheira, H.(2007, Fall). Security as an individual and international Issue, International Psychology Bulletin, 11, 30–32.
Malley-Morrison, K., Daskalopoulos, M., & You, H-S. (2006, winter). International perspectives on governmental aggression, International Psychology Reporter, 19–20.
Malley-Morrison, K. et al. (2006, spring). International perspectives on war and peace. Peace Psychology, 15(1), 6–7.
Mercurio, A. E., You, H. S., & Malley-Morrison, K. (2006, Spring). Reasoning about parental rights to physically discipline children in the United States and Korea. International Psychology Bulletin, 10, 12–13.

External links
GIPGAP
Personal and Institutional Rights to Aggression and Peace Scale
APO online information

Boston University
International research institutes
Peace organizations